Le Mesnil may refer to:

Places
Le Mesnil or le Mesnail is the name or part of the name of several places:

Belgium
 Le Mesnil, Belgium, a commune in the municipality of Viroinval in the Namur province

France
Mesnil and Le Mesnil is the name or part of the name of several communes or former communes in France:

 Le Mesnil, in the Manche département
 Le Mesnil-Amelot, in the Seine-et-Marne département
 Le Mesnil Auzouf, in the Calvados département 
 Le Mesnil Bacley, in the Calvados département 
 Le Mesnil-Benoist, in the Calvados département
 Le Mesnil-Bœuf, a former commune that is now a part of Isigny-le-Buat in the Manche département 
 Le Mesnil-Bonant, a former commune that is now a part of Gavray in the Manche département
 Le Mesnil Caussois, in the Calvados département
 Le Mesnil Dray, a former commune that is now a part of Foligny in the Manche département  
 Le Mesnil Durand, in the Calvados département
 Le Mesnil-Esnard, in the Seine-Maritime département
 Le Mesnil-Eudes, in the Calvados département 
 Le Mesnil Germain, in the Calvados département
 Le Mesnil au Grain, in the Calvados département  
 Le Mesnil Guillaume, in the Calvados département
 Le Mesnil-Hue, a former commune that is now part of Gavray in the Manche département
 Le Mesnil-Mauger, in the Calvados département
 Le Mesnil-sur-Oger, in the Marne département
 Le Mesnil-Patry, in the Calvados département 
 Le Mesnil-Robert, in the Calvados département 
 Le Mesnil-Simon (disambiguation)
 Le Mesnil-sur-Blangy, in the Calvados département
 Le Mesnil-Thébault, a former commune that is now a part of Isigny-le-Buat in the Manche département 
 Le Mesnil Villement, in the Calvados département  
 Mesnil-Clinchamps, in the Calvados département

See also
 Mesnil (disambiguation)
 Les Mesnuls, an interesting name variant in the Yvelines département